Henry Thomas Hope (30 April 1808 – 4 December 1862) was a British MP and patron of the arts.

Biography
Henry Thomas Hope was born in London on 30 April 1808, the eldest of the three sons of the connoisseur Thomas Hope (1769–1831) and his wife Louisa de la Poer Beresford (daughter of William Beresford, 1st Baron Decies, younger son of George Beresford, 1st Marquess of Waterford). However, he was estranged from his brothers (including Alexander James Beresford Hope) when he inherited their father's art collections, wealth and property along with those of their uncle Henry Philip Hope (died 1839).  Part of Hope's inheritance from his uncle included the Hope Diamond.

He entered a political career after studying at Eton College and Trinity College, Cambridge (1825–29). He was briefly a Groom of the Bedchamber to Kings George IV and William IV between March and November 1830.

He also founded the Art Union of London and the Royal Botanic Society, as well as serving as vice-president of the Society of Arts and president of the Surrey Archaeological Society. Displaying his old masters collection to the public at his London house on Duchess Street, a mansion at 116 Piccadilly and at Deepdene House in Surrey.  He was also a patron to idealists such as Young England and the Spanish Carlists and helped organise the 1851 Great Exhibition. From 1851 to 1858 he chaired the Eastern Steam Navigation Company for Isambard Kingdom Brunel, with Henry having been the Great Eastern's chief fundraiser.

In 1853, he purchased Blayney Castle in Castleblayney, County Monaghan, Ireland, from The 12th Baron Blayney. He renamed the country house as Hope Castle.

Death
Hope died on 4 December 1862 at 116 Piccadilly, London.

Personal life
In 1851 Hope married Anne Adele Bichat, having already had a daughter named Henrietta Adela with her in 1843. The marriage legitimised Henrietta, who in 1861 married Lord Lincoln (later sixth Duke of Newcastle).  After her first husband's death, Henrietta married Thomas Theobald Hohler.

Constituencies
East Looe, 1829–32
Gloucester, stood unsuccessfully in December 1832
Marylebone, stood unsuccessfully in March 1833
Gloucester, 1833–52

References

External links 
 

1808 births
1862 deaths
Hope family
English art collectors
Alumni of Trinity College, Cambridge
People educated at Eton College
Members of the Parliament of the United Kingdom for English constituencies
Members of the Parliament of the United Kingdom for constituencies in Cornwall
UK MPs 1826–1830
UK MPs 1830–1831
UK MPs 1831–1832
UK MPs 1832–1835
UK MPs 1835–1837
UK MPs 1837–1841
Politicians from London
Members of Parliament for Gloucester
UK MPs 1847–1852